High School Football Heroes (HSFH) is a ska punk band from Long Island, New York.  HSFH blends the sound of 3rd wave ska with indie rock, drawing comparisons to acts such as Less Than Jake, Taking Back Sunday, RX Bandits and Sublime. The band released two records with Asbestos Records. In late 2006 the band disbanded as members opted to pursue other interests. In 2014 the band reunited and began releasing music in a yearly demo format. The most recent HSFH releases are always available for free download through the band's digital platforms. They are also available for streaming via all major outlets.

Members of High School Football Heroes have performed with Against Me!, Catch 22, The King Blues, Straylight Run, The Fad and Edna's Goldfish. Dave Solomon and Jason Rutcofsky were early members of Bomb the Music Industry!.

Original Run 

HSFH began releasing yearly demos in 2001. During this time, the band also released a split EP with fellow Long Island ska band Premarital Sax, under Justin Conrad's Crappy Jack Records label. By 2003, enough EPs and demos had been distributed, and enough of a response had been garnered to warrant a full-length release. "Close Only Counts in Horseshoes and Hand Grenades" is the first (and only) full-length release from HSFH, consisting of 14 songs. The album was the first of two HSFH albums to be released by Asbestos Records (CT). Recorded at Sabella Studios of Roslyn Heights, NY, the 28 minute full length is a frantic, energy-filled production that provides a close representation of the  band's live performances at the time.

After three years of consistent touring, the band released a self-recorded six-song EP entitled "We've Fooled Around Long Enough". The album was recorded at Hofstra University, using Jason Rutcofsky's studio time as a student there. High School Football Heroes self-recorded and self-produced the album, with Dave Solomon and Chris Askin recording the guitar tracks in the absence of a permanent member at the time. Receiving extremely positive reviews and fueled by a long stint on the Van's Warped Tour, 3,500 copies of "We've Fooled Around Long Enough" were sold in the two months following its release.

Breakup 
In 2006, coming off of the Van's Warped Tour, the band decided to disband, citing various reasons. Between 2006–2014, members of HSFH joined or started other acts on Long Island including Barnaby Jones, Family Lumber, Trust in Numbers, Rice Cultivation Society, ROBBERS, and The Nix86.

In 2011, Dave Solomon, Joe Masterson, Jason Rutcofsky, Chris Askin and Travis Herdt (a past HSFH guitarist) formed Liars, Etc. With similar writing to HSFH, Liars Etc. carries a similar feel to HSFH, but without a horn section. Liars Etc. has not released any recorded music to date.

Go Big! was formed and is fronted by Jason Rutcofsky. In addition to lead vocals, Rutcofsky performs on guitar, piano, synthesizer and saxophone. Joe Masterson and Dave Solomon of HSFH are also permanent members of Go Big!. The band is active and performs regularly in the Long Island/NYC area.

Return 
In late 2013, Dave Solomon and George Argyrou began writing songs together, with intentions of performing as a two-piece acoustic act.  Within a matter of months, HSFH reunited, adding Jeff Bourlier of Too Short Notice (NJ) on guitar as a permanent member. In December 2014, the band released "2K14", its first recording since 2006. In 2015, Jeff's brother Scott Bourlier (also formerly of Too Short Notice) joined HSFH on trombone.

Discography
¡Viva La Rock! (2001, Crappy Jack Records)
Close Only Counts in Horseshoes and Hand Grenades (2004, Asbestos Records)
We've Fooled Around Long Enough... (2006, Asbestos Records)
2K14 (2014 - Digital)
2K15 - Like Dynamite (2015 - Digital)

External links
 
 Bandcamp

American ska punk musical groups
Musical groups from Long Island